Homona umbrigera is a species of moth of the family Tortricidae. It is found on Sumba in Indonesia.

References

Moths described in 1952
Homona (moth)